Farwell Canyon (known to the local Tsilhqot'in First Nation as Nagwentled - 'place of landslides') is a canyon on the Chilcotin River in the Chilcotin District of British Columbia, Canada, located around the confluence of Farwell Creek and the Chilcotin, between the confluence of Big Creek and the Fraser River.  This location has been significant to First Nations for countless generations as an important salmon fishing site. In the same area along the Chilcotin are the Farwell Rapids.

See also
Big Creek Canyon

References

Canyons and gorges of British Columbia
Landforms of the Chilcotin